The European Journal of Integrative Medicine is a quarterly peer-reviewed medical journal covering integrative and alternative medicine. It was established in 2009 and is published by Elsevier. The editor-in-chief is Nicola Robinson (London South Bank University). According to the Journal Citation Reports, the journal has a 2020 impact factor of 1.314.

References

External links

Publications established in 2009
Quarterly journals
Alternative and traditional medicine journals
Elsevier academic journals
English-language journals